Silent Running: My Years on a World War II Attack Submarine is a memoir written in 1995 by Vice Admiral James F. Calvert, USN (Ret.) and published by John Wiley & Sons in 1995. It is held in almost 600 US libraries.

The book covers the period from June 1943 until the end of the Pacific War in July 1945 with the surrender of Japan.

The book is named after the eponymous stealth mode of submarine operation.

References

1995 non-fiction books
World War II memoirs
History books about World War II
Books of naval history